Six O'Clock News may refer to:

 News at Six (Hong Kong TV programme) (1957–2016), a defunct evening news bulletin on Asia Television in Hong Kong
 RTÉ News: Six One (1962–present), an Irish evening news bulletin on RTÉ One
 BBC News at Six (1984–present), formerly BBC Six O'Clock News, the main evening newscast on BBC One in the United Kingdom
 STV News at Six (2009–present), three separate news programmes on STV in the North, East and West regions of Scotland
 Six O'Clock News (BBC Radio 4), a news programme on BBC Radio 4
 Six O'Clock News (film), a 1996 documentary film by Ross McElwee about television news in the United States
 "Six O'Clock News", a song by John Prine on his eponymous album John Prine

See also
 One O'Clock News (disambiguation)
 Five O'Clock News (disambiguation)
 Nine O'Clock News (disambiguation)
 News at One (disambiguation)
 News at Ten (disambiguation)